Jackson's hornbill (Tockus jacksoni) is a species of hornbill in the family Bucerotidae. It is only found in North West Kenya and North East Uganda. Except for the dense white spots on the wing-coverts, it resembles, and is often considered a subspecies of, Von der Decken's hornbill.

References

Jackson's hornbill
Hornbills
Birds of East Africa
Jackson's hornbill
Taxonomy articles created by Polbot